Hygebald (and variants such as Hygbald, Higbald, and Higebald) can refer to any of two or three known Anglo-Saxons:
 Hygebald, abbot and author of a prayer beginning "in primis obsecro supplex obnixis precibus" (possibly identical with 2 below) 
 Hybald (seventh-century saint)
 Higbald of Lindisfarne (died 803)